The Govorukha is a river in Perm Krai, Russia, a right tributary of the Vishera, which in turn is a tributary of the Kama. The Govorukha flows into the Vishera  from the Vishera's mouth. The main tributaries are the Vilva and Belaya rivers (both are left).

References 

Rivers of Perm Krai